Sir Jerome Horsey (c. 1550 – 1626), of Great Kimble, Buckinghamshire, was an English explorer, diplomat and politician in the 16th and 17th centuries.

He spent much time in Russia over the course of seventeen years, first arriving in 1573 and leaving in 1591. He got to know well many leading people at the Russian Court.  He first travelled to Moscow as an agent for the Russia Company, and later acted as an envoy of Tsar Ivan the Terrible to Queen Elizabeth and then from the English court under Queen Elizabeth to Ivan. After returning to England, Horsey served in the House of Commons, sitting on many committees including the Committee for Returns, Elections, and Privileges. Knighted in 1603, he wrote accounts of his time in Russia which have been published several times, and was the subject of two novels.

Family background
Horsey was the son of William Horsey, a merchant at Exeter, by Elinor Peryam. He was the grandson of Sir John Horsey II of Sherborne, Dorset and nephew of Sir Edward Horsey who was Captain of the Isle of Wight in the period leading up to the Spanish Armada. Horsey probably married three times:
Elizabeth Hampden whom he married in January 1592, by whom he had 2 sons and 3 daughters.  She died in 1607.
Isabella Brocket whom he married  about October 1609.
Elizabeth North (uncertain - not mentioned in will)

At the court of Ivan IV
Horsey was apprenticed to the Russia Company in 1571, but the latter was prevented from trading in Russia for a period and his first experience was of trading with the Dutch. Initially he went to Russia in May 1573 on the resumption of trade and was an interpreter. On his way to Moscow he was given gold and jewels by the gentry and clergy of Kostroma for saving the town from the Tsar.

On arriving in Moscow he supposedly rescued Madelyn van Uxell from being sent to a brothel by the Tsar, an act which served him well later. The Russia Company asked Horsey to negotiate a new charter and to use his influence to get extra land for the English compound (which still stands on Varvarka Street in Zaryadye). Part of this land was set aside for his own house, where he entertained Russian noblemen and had personal servants.

He later boasted of saving a number of German prisoners taken when the colony was supposedly massacred. The merchants of Hamburg later gave him a damask tablecloth and napkins while those of Lübeck gave him a "great silver loving cup". He also befriended the 1200 Scots (and a few English) prisoners that were in Moscow. He arranged for them to get paid employment in the Russian Army and got permission for them to build a church.

During his time in Moscow, Horsey seems to have carried out private trading on behalf of members of the English Court, such as Leicester and Walsingham, which was against the rules of the Russia Company. This later caused a dispute with the company, but eventually the problem was resolved by his giving up the property he owned in Moscow, and it was found that they owed him money rather than the other way around.

At the court of Ivan's successors

Horsey seems to have spent considerable time at the Russian Court, being invited by Tsar Ivan into the Treasury and attending the coronation of his successor Tsar Theodore. The Russian Court was very divided. Jerome says that "my most implacable enemy" was Vasily Shchelkanov but Boris Godunov was a friend.

Another friend, whom he seems later to have wanted to marry, was Princess Maria Vladimirovna. Maria first became the wife of Magnus the Dane but after Magnus's death Horsey was asked by Boris to persuade her to return to Russia where she was imprisoned. However, the marriage with Maria was not allowed as he was a commoner, and she was placed in a nunnery.

In late November 1581 Horsey was asked by Ivan to take letters, hidden in a flask, to Queen Elizabeth. He had to travel overland as the sea was frozen. This journey was very difficult and included being arrested at the Danish island of Oesel, but the wife of the governor happened to be Madelyn van Uxel whom he had saved earlier. Horsey also had to pass through Pilten where he met Maria the Russian princess.

Second visit to Russia
On arrival in London, Horsey had several meetings with Queen Elizabeth, translating the papers he had carried into English. Horsey returned to Russia with nine ships loaded with cargo, partly supplied by adventurers outside the Russia Company.

He later returned to England with letters from the Tsar asking for help, as the wife of the Tsar was having difficulty conceiving. But this was misunderstood, and Jerome returned with a midwife, which did not go down well at the Russian court. The English at this time also lost favour as it was thought that the Spanish would conquer England. When the Russians learned that the Spanish Armada was scattered, the English had half their customs duty removed.

Horsey again returned to England in 1587, having apparently agreed with Boris Godunov that he would marry Maria on his return. He was then accused of fraud. However, his friends at the English Court stood by him. He was asked to return to Russia in 1591, but the Tsar would not see him and asked Elizabeth never to permit him to come to Russia again. He was accused of being "a well known spy". Boris Godunov arranged for his journey back to England and gave him a large present of money.

Return to England
In 1595 Horsey was accused of high treason by Finch, whom he had caused to be sent home from Moscow. It is thought that Finch was put up to this by Sir Jeremy Bowes, the ex-ambassador to Moscow, who thought that Horsey had caused him to be sent home by the Russians. Among other things, Horsey was stated to have said "Our Virgin Quene is no more a virgin than I am". The queen had no choice but to sign a warrant for his arrest, but she said "I still believe Jerome Horsey will prove himself honest". The case came before the Privy Council in April 1597 but was dismissed, and Finch was proved to be a liar by witnesses.

Horsey worked for the Russia Company from 1572 to about 1585. He was made an Esquire of the Body to Queen Elizabeth in 1580, was knighted on 23 July 1603 and Receiver of Crown Lands in nine counties in June 1604. He was a Justice of the Peace in Buckinghamshire from about 1601 and High Sheriff of Buckinghamshire in 1611–12. He represented various places, Saltash (1593), Camelford (1597), Bossiney (1601, 1604 and 1614) and East Looe (1621), in Parliament, serving over 30 years. He translated the Slavonic Bible and was responsible for introducing the term "White Russia" into England for Belarus.

He died in January 1626 and was buried at Great Kimble. Horsey is occasionally cited as a contemporary authority on Eastern Europe, Russia, and the reign of Ivan the Terrible.

References
Horsey, Jerome: The ...   coronation of Theodore Iuanowich, emperour of Russia (in Hakuyt R, The Principal Navigations Vol 1, 1598).
Horsey, Jerome: Extracts out of Sir J H's Observations in seventeene yeares travels and experience in Russia (in Purchas P, Purchas' Pilgrimages, 1626).
Bond: Russia at the Close of the Sixteenth Century. Hakluyt Society 1856.
Bond, Edward Augustus: Introduction, in: Russia at the close of the sixteenth century. Comprising, The treatise "Of the Russe Common Wealth" by Dr. Giles Fletcher and The Travels of Sir Jerome Horsey. Knt., London 1861, S. XLIII ff.
Schmidt, Albert J. (Hg.): Introduction, in: Of the Rus Commonwealth by Giles Fletcher, Ithaca 1966.
Berry, Lloyd E. and Crummey, Robert O.: Sir Jerome Horsey, in: Rude & Barbarous Kingdom. Russia in the Sixteenth-Century English Voyagers, Madison London 1968, p. 249-372.
MacKenzie D: Tsar Ivan and the Scots soldiers  (in Stories of Russian Folk Life, 1916).  sacred-texts.com
MacLeod A: The Muscovite, 1971.
Palmer, Daryl W.: The Case of Jerome Horsey, in: Writing Russia in the age of Shakespeare, Hampshire-Burlington 2004, p. 97-128, "Writing Russia in the age of Shakespeare", Insights.  Accessed 2009-10-17.
Biography of Ivan the Terrible.  Accessed 2005-09-15.
Tatiana V. Chumakova. "Britain and Russian culture in the middle ages".  Accessed 2005-09-15.
Olga A. Pilkington, "Spring Always Comes after Winter", Insights.  Accessed 2005-09-15.
,  notes in the House of Commons Journal from the period.  Accessed 2005-09-15.
Richard Hellie, ‘Horsey, Sir Jerome (d. 1626)’, Oxford Dictionary of National Biography, Oxford University Press, 2004, accessed 22 Dec 2006

1550s births
1626 deaths
English diplomats
English explorers
Members of the Parliament of England for Saltash
Year of birth unknown
People from Buckinghamshire
High Sheriffs of Buckinghamshire
People of the Muscovy Company
English MPs 1593
English MPs 1597–1598
English MPs 1601
English MPs 1604–1611
English MPs 1614
English MPs 1621–1622
Esquires of the Body
Writers about Russia
Members of the Parliament of England for Camelford
Members of the Parliament of England for Bossiney
Members of the Parliament of England (pre-1707) for East Looe